Colney Butts is the former name of an area of Watford, Hertfordshire, England, around Vicarage Road and the cemetery.

References

Watford